2010 draft may refer to drafts held in several different sports leagues around the world in the year 2010, including:
The 2010 WPS Draft for Women's Professional Soccer, held on January 15
The 2010 WNBA Draft for the Women's National Basketball Association, held on April 8
The 2010 NFL Draft for the National Football League, held from April 22–24
The 2010 WWE Draft for World Wrestling Entertainment, held from April 26–27
The 2010 CFL Draft for the Canadian Football League, held on May 2
The 2010 UFL Draft for the United Football League, held on June 2
The 2010 KHL Junior Draft for the Kontinental Hockey League, held on June 4
The 2010 Major League Baseball Draft for Major League Baseball, held from June 7–9
The 2010 NBA Draft for the National Basketball Association, held on June 24
The 2010 NHL Entry Draft for the National Hockey League, held from June 25–26
The 2010 CWHL Draft for the Canadian Women's Hockey League, held on August 12
The 2010 PBA Draft for the Philippine Basketball Association, held on August 29
The 2010 NBA Development League Draft for the NBA Development League, held on November 1
The 2010 AFL Draft for the Australian Football League, held on November 18